Pritilata Mahila Mahavidyalaya is a college situated at Panikhali in Nadia district. It was founded as women's college; now it is co-educational. It offers undergraduate courses in arts. It is affiliated to University of Kalyani. The name commemorates the legacy of freedom fighter and revolutionary Pritilata Waddedar.

History
Some academics of Panikhali and its nearby area wanted to establish a government aided general degree college. As there was no college within around 15 km, there was a serious need. The support of local villagers, academics, and government departments helped to overcome many obstacles to establish this college.

In 2007 they established "Pritilata Mahila Mahavidyalaya" with the girls’ education affiliated by the University of Kalyani.

Initially the classes ware taken at Jugal Kishore S.S. Sikhyatan. After that, with financial aid from Sheikh Khabir Uddin Ahmed, Member of the Parliament of India and M.L.A. Dabendranath Biswas, the college's building and infrastructure was developed. In 2009 classes and administrative work were shifted to the present premises.

Departments

Arts
Bengali (Hons. & Gen)
English
History (Hons. & Gen)
Political Science
Philosophy

See also

References

External links
www.pwmpanikhali.in 
University of Kalyani
University Grants Commission
National Assessment and Accreditation Council

Women's universities and colleges in West Bengal
Universities and colleges in Nadia district
Colleges affiliated to University of Kalyani
Educational institutions established in 2007
2007 establishments in West Bengal